Ara Abrahamian (born 27 July 1975) is an Armenian-Swedish wrestler in Greco-Roman wrestling. He has won two World Championships in the 76 kg and 84 kg weight classes and a silver medal at the 2004 Summer Olympics in the 84 kg weight class. 
He also won the bronze match at the 2008 Summer Olympics, but he rejected the medal because of a controversial ruling in the semifinal. During the highly publicised medal ceremony, Abrahamian protested by placing the medal in the center of the mat and walking away. He was later disqualified by the International Olympic Committee (IOC) and stripped of his rejected bronze medal for disrupting the award ceremony. This resulted in him receiving a lifetime ban from the Olympics. He was also banned from wrestling for two years by FILA, but the ban was overturned by the Court of Arbitration for Sport in March 2009.

Biography
Abrahamian began his wrestling career at the age of eight in Armenia. He became Armenian junior champion on three occasions. In 1994 he arrived in Stockholm, Sweden, to compete in the Stockholm Junior Open, which he won. He defected from the Armenia national team and joined the Swedish team in 1998.

Participation in the Olympics

2000 Summer Olympics 
Abrahamian represented Sweden in Greco-Roman Wrestling in the 2000 Summer Olympics in the 69-76 kg weight category.

2004 Summer Olympics 
Abrahamian's participation in the 2004 Summer Olympics was planned to mark the end of his career, and he was determined to bring home the gold medal. After losing the prolonged final with Alexei Michine of Russia, Abrahamian wrote on his homepage: "The final ended 1-1. That means losing, in case you meet a Russian."

Pelle Svensson, a former two-time world champion (Greco-Roman 100 kg class) and member of board of FILA from 1990 to 2007, witnessed how the Russian team leader Mikhail Mamiashvili was giving signs to the referee. When Svensson approached him and informed him that this was not allowed according to the rules, Mamiashvili responded by saying: "you should know that this may lead to your death". Svensson later found proof that the Romanian referee was bribed (according to Svensson the referee had received over one million Swedish krona).

2008 Summer Olympics

Semi-final
Following a loss in the semi finals of the Greco-Roman 84 kg event at the 2008 Summer Olympics to the eventual winner Andrea Minguzzi of Italy, he and the Swedish coach Leo Mylläri disputed the judges' ruling. Mylläri accused the judges of corruption because they initially awarded Abrahamian a point, but after the round they assigned the point and the match to Minguzzi because Abrahamian had his hand in the blue zone. Normally, having a hand in the blue zone is not penalized. Minguzzi had almost his whole body in the blue zone earlier in this match. Therefore, the Swedes demanded a video review of the match, but the referees refused to review the recording of the incidents nor consider the written Swedish protest.

Medal ceremony
Abrahamian returned to the event to compete in the resulting bronze bout and won. After he received his medal at the ceremony, he calmly shook the hand of the presenter and then the hand of the other bronze medal winner. He then stepped off the podium and placed the medal in the center of the wrestling mat and left the ceremony. Abrahamian complained later about the corrupt judges and declared that he was retiring from the sport. Abrahamian says that the judges had been bribed, and reminded that the judge through marriage is related to Raphaël Martinetti, the President of FILA, the governing body of wrestling.

IOC hearing
The International Olympic Committee held a "disciplinary hearing" on Abrahamian after the incident, where it was decided that Abrahamian would be disqualified  and excluded from the Olympic Games due to "violating the spirit of fair play". After the hearing, Abrahamian declared to a Swedish newspaper that the FILA representative stated after 1.5 hours into the hearing that he could not speak English, and he merely read some lines from a paper he had written in French. Abrahamian was later banned for life, as he did not apologize to the IOC. The medal was not awarded to him or to Chinese wrestler Ma Sanyi, because it did not happen in the award ceremony.

CAS hearing
The Court of Arbitration for Sport also held a hearing based on the request which was issued by Abrahamian and the Swedish Olympic Committee against the FILA. Preceding the hearing CAS declared in a statement that Abrahamian and the SOC "do not seek from the CAS any particular relief" regarding the ranking of the medals or a review of the IOC decision to exclude Abrahamian from the games.

Following the CAS issued an arbitration strongly criticizing FILA. Not challenging the outcome of the match and the technical judgments, the arbitration stated that the FILA is required to provide an appeal jury capable of dealing promptly with the claims of the athletes. Moreover, CAS, concluded that "In any event, FILA did not follow Article 22 properly, if at all, or provide any other appropriate appeal mechanism in this case."

The chairman of the Swedish Olympic Committee, Stefan Lindeberg, commented that the decision once and for all shows that FILA did not act correctly and that they did not follow their own rules of fair play.

In February 2009 CAS rejected an appeal requesting reinstatement of the bronze medal.

FILA verdict
On 6 November 2008, FILA published the verdicts of their investigation, in which they suspended Abrahamian and coach Mylläri for two years, and banned Sweden's wrestling federation from hosting international events for the same duration. Money fines were also issued to all three parties. In their statement FILA justified the verdict with Abrahamian's "scandalous behaviour" and "serious lack of Olympic spirit". They also declared that "the coach has been judged equally guilty since he did not intervene to calm his wrestler" and that "the federation was responsible for the behavior of its members, the wrestler and the coach, which was reprehensible". They also stated that the decision by the judges in the disputed bout was made according to the rules.

Freed from ban
In March 2009 the Court of Arbitration for Sport overturned FILA's ban on Abrahamian. On 27 August 2009 it was revealed that Abrahamian was free to continue wrestling, that he would not be banned at all for his actions during the medal ceremony, that he does not have to pay any fine to FILA, and that there will be no obstacle for the Swedish wrestling organization to host tournaments in the future.

Major achievements

References

External links 
 Ara Abrahamian, official website
 Ara Abrahamian, profile at the 2008 Summer Olympics website

1975 births
Living people
Sportspeople from Gyumri
Swedish male sport wrestlers
Armenian male sport wrestlers
Olympic wrestlers of Sweden
Wrestlers at the 2000 Summer Olympics
Wrestlers at the 2004 Summer Olympics
Wrestlers at the 2008 Summer Olympics
Olympic silver medalists for Sweden
Olympic medalists in wrestling
Competitors stripped of Summer Olympics medals
Medalists at the 2004 Summer Olympics
World Wrestling Championships medalists
Swedish people of Armenian descent
World Wrestling Champions
European Wrestling Championships medalists